Ideanomics, Inc. (NASDAQ: IDEX) is a global electric vehicle company that is focused on driving the adoption of electric commercial vehicles and associated sustainable energy consumption. It is made up of 5 subsidiaries including: VIA Motors, Solectrac, Treeletrik, Wave, and US Hybrid.  Ideanomics is a CALSTART member, a national non-profit organization focused on accelerating clean transportation; CALSTART's expertise lies in providing early adopters with leadership, connections and funding to accelerate the deployment of game-changing technologies.  

The company provides turn-key vehicle, finance, leasing, and energy management services for commercial fleet operators. Its Ideanomics Mobility division has a strong ‘Made in America’ theme, and boasts a market validated, and revenue producing, deployment of technologies and vehicles for high-growth commercial fleet segments such as last-mile and local delivery, wireless charging, Hydrogen fuel cells, and Agritech.

The company's vehicle division, Ideanomics Mobility, is headed by Robin Mackie who serves as the chairman. The company is headquartered in New York City, New York in the United States.

History 
The company was founded in 2004 by Shane McMahon who currently also serves as the chairman. Alf Poor is the incumbent chief executive officer serving since February 2019.

In October 2018, they purchased a building at $5.2M UConn campus in West Hartford to move their operations to. 

In June 2021, the company was included in the broad-market Russell 3000 Index. In the same month, it also acquired US Hybrid, zero-emission vehicle manufacturer.

In August 2021, it acquired Via Motors for USD 630 million. It has previously acquired US Hybrid, an electric powertrain components and fuel cell engines manufacturer; Solectrac, which is one of two electric tractor manufacturers in the United States; Wave, a wireless charging company.

In March 2022, it acquired Italian electric motorcycle manufacturer Energica.

In October 2022, it claims is the largest assembly plant for electric tractors in North America. The plant in Windsor, California, has the capacity to produce 4,100 electric tractors annually.

Tractors 
e25 model is a compact electric tractor, with its 22 kWh battery.

In 2023, Ideanomics also plans to begin assembling the model e70N, a specially designed, narrow model purpose-built for handling and manoeuvrability on vineyards and farm operations. The N stands for narrow and includes a 52 kW all-wheel drive and a 60 kWh LFP battery, to allow up to eight hours of operation, with the company also mentioning solar array options online. The e70N’s swappable battery pack, allows even longer operation in busy seasons. The Bay Area Air Quality Management District’s Funding Agriculture Replacement Measures for Emission Reductions Demonstration Program (FARMER), provides up to 80 per cent of the cost for farmers to replace diesel tractors with less polluting alternatives.

Clients and major sales 

 In February 2021, AVTA (Antelope Valley Transit Authority) bought 19 electric vans from Ideanomics.
 In December 2021, subsidiary US Hybrid received a $5.5 million order from Global Environmental Products (GEP) to electrify street sweepers.

References

External links

American companies established in 2004
2004 establishments in New York City
Electric vehicle manufacturers of the United_States
Electric utility vehicles
Electric tractors
Companies listed on the Nasdaq